I Believe may refer to:

Music

Albums
I Believe (Dr. Alban album), and the title song, 1997
I Believe (Irfan Makki album), and the title song, 2011
I Believe (Johnny Cash album), a 1984 reissue of songs from A Believer Sings the Truth (1979)
I Believe (Marvin Sapp album), 2002
I Believe (Rapture Ruckus album), and the title song, 2006
I Believe (Sérgio Mendes album), and the title cover version of a Stevie Wonder song (see below), 1975
I Believe (Tata Young album), and the title cover version of the Carola Häggkvist song "I Believe in Love", 2004
I Believe (Tim Burgess album), 2003
I Believe, by the LeBrón Brothers, 1969
I Believe, by Lee Soo-young, 1999
I Believe, by R.W. Hampton, 2005
I Believe, by Willie Norwood, and the title song, 2006

Songs
"I Believe" (Ayaka song), 2006
"I Believe" (Blessid Union of Souls song), 1995
"I Believe" (Bon Jovi song), 1993
"I Believe" (Bro'Sis song), 2001
"I Believe" (Chilliwack song), 1982
"I Believe" (DJ Khaled song), 2018
"I Believe" (Diamond Rio song), 2002
"I Believe" (EMF song), 1991
"I Believe" (Fantasia song), 2004
"I Believe" (Frankie Laine song), 1953, recorded by many others
"I Believe" (Galleon song), 2001
"I Believe" (George Strait song), 2013
"I Believe" (Happy Clappers song), 1995
"I Believe" (Marcella Detroit song), 1994, covered by Joana Zimmer (2005)
"I Believe" (Nikki Yanofsky song), 2010
"I Believe" (R. Kelly song), 2008
"I Believe" (Sash! song), 2002
"I Believe" (Sounds of Blackness song), 1994
"I Believe" (Stephen Gately song), 2000
"I Believe" (Tears for Fears song), 1985
"I Believe (Get Over Yourself)", by Nico Vega, 2014
"I Believe (When I Fall in Love It Will Be Forever)", by Stevie Wonder, 1972
"(I Believe) Love's a Prima Donna", by Steve Harley & Cockney Rebel, 1976
"I Believe", by Abra Moore from On the Way
"I Believe", by Bob Sinclar
"I Believe", by Booth and the Bad Angel
"I Believe", by Bosson from One in a Million
"I Believe", by Buzzcocks from A Different Kind of Tension
"I Believe", by Chicago from Chicago 18
"I Believe", by Chris Isaak from Forever Blue
"I Believe", by David Hasselhoff and Laura Branigan from the television series Baywatch
"I Believe", by Elliot Minor from Solaris
"I Believe", by Era from The Very Best of Era, also covered by Katherine Jenkins with Andrea Bocelli
"I Believe", by HammerFall from Glory to the Brave
"I Believe", by The High Spirits
"I Believe", by Ian Dury and the Blockheads from Ten More Turnips from the Tip
"I Believe", by Jessica Mauboy from Beautiful
"I Believe", by Joe Satriani from Flying in a Blue Dream
"I Believe", by Jonas Brothers from Happiness Begins
"I Believe", by Manowar from Dawn of Battle
"I Believe", by Paulini from Superwoman
"I Believe", by R.E.M. from Lifes Rich Pageant
"I Believe", by Robert Plant from Fate of Nations
"I Believe", by Shin Seung Hun from the soundtrack of the film My Sassy Girl
"I Believe", by Simian Mobile Disco from Attack Decay Sustain Release
"I Believe", by Soulfly from Prophecy
"I Believe", by Steve Perry from Street Talk
"I Believe", by Stephen Gately from New Beginning
"I Believe", by Third Day from Wire
"I Believe", by Tiffany Thornton and Kermit the Frog
"I Believe", by Tigertailz from Wazbones
"I Believe", by Tomomi Kahala
"I Believe", by Yolanda Adams from Honey: Music from & Inspired by the Motion Picture
"I Believe", from the film It Happened in Brooklyn
"I Believe", from the musical Altar Boyz
"I Believe", from the musical The Book of Mormon
"I Believe", from the musical Spring Awakening

Other uses
 I Believe (film), a 2016 Singaporean short directed by Leroy Lim
 I Believe, a 2017 film featuring Wilford Brimley
 I Believe, a play by Gibson Kente

See also
Credo (disambiguation)
I Do Believe (disambiguation)
I Believe in You (disambiguation)
Believe (disambiguation)